Yamila Hernández (born 8 November 1992) is a Cuban female volleyball player. She is a member of the Cuba women's national volleyball team and played for La Habana in 2014. She was part of the Cuban national team at the 2014 FIVB Volleyball Women's World Championship in Italy.

Clubs
  La Habana (2014)

References

1992 births
Living people
Cuban women's volleyball players
Place of birth missing (living people)
Volleyball players at the 2015 Pan American Games
Pan American Games competitors for Cuba
Setters (volleyball)